Charalampos Kokolis (born 21 January 1985) is a Greek football player who currently plays for Greek Football League 2 side Panelefsiniakos

External links
https://web.archive.org/web/20140202115903/http://myplayer.gr/index.php?option=com_myplayer_players&view=player&player=416

Living people
Greek footballers
1985 births
Association football defenders
Association football midfielders
Panelefsiniakos F.C. players
People from Lefkada
Sportspeople from the Ionian Islands (region)